The Kidney Education Foundation (KEF) is a health awareness organization focused on kidney diseases. It provides information about the prevention and care of kidney diseases through books and websites currently translated in 39 international languages.

The organization has been founded by an Indian nephrologist, Dr Sanjay Pandya, in 2010 to create awareness about kidney disease prevention primarily through free access to information to the general population. For this common cause, nephrologists across the globe have joined this mission, including many leaders of the international nephrology community such as Dr Giuseppe Remuzzi, Past-President of the International Society of Nephrology, who prepared the Italian version and Dr Guillermo García-García, President of the International Federation of Kidney Foundations, who prepared the Spanish version of the book and website.

The book and website offer comprehensive information about common kidney-related disorders, and their prevention and care on a single platform in many different languages.

The American Society of Nephrology (ASN) published an extensive article in March 2020, recognising the Foundation's work and mission. KEF is endorsed by the World Kidney Day (WKD) campaign as an external organisation supporting World Kidney Day activity. ERA-EDTA (European Renal Association - European Dialysis and Transplant Association) has cited KEF as its first resource for patient education.

History

In 2005, Dr Sanjay Pandya began drafting a book to educate patients about the prevention and care of kidney diseases and common issues related to kidneys. His book, written in Gujarati is titled Tamari Kidney Bachavo, which translates to Save Your Kidneys. Attributing to its success in the state, the book was later translated into Hindi (2008) by Pandya to make it accessible to a wider audience across India.

In 2010, Pandya founded the Kidney Education Foundation to overcome the two biggest hurdles of inaccessibility and language barriers, to reach the global population. Initially, the Hindi and Gujarati editions were released on the internet to achieve this goal with the launch of the KEF website. In 2012, Pandya wrote and released a free online English edition. Following these early books, several nephrologists from across the world joined this cause with time.

Various teams of international nephrologists began to translate the content in their native languages, making it available to their local vernacular (non-English speaking) audience. In a span of eight years, a team of more than 100 nephrologists at the Kidney Education Foundation has developed books and websites in 39 languages, including major international languages such as English, Italian, Chinese, Spanish, French, Arabic, Hindi, Russian, Portuguese and Japanese.

Organization

The Kidney Education Foundation consists of nephrologists from around the globe, who play the role of individual language project leaders. The team efforts are driven by Founder and Chief Mentor, Dr Sanjay Pandya from Rajkot, India. Pandya coordinates with all the nephrologists, thus ensuring the preparation and publication of the book and website.

Dr Tushar Vachharajani serves as the International Liaison Officer who seeks world kidney experts with similar philanthropic interest aligned with the Foundation's mission. He invites them to join this initiative and help prepare a version of the kidney book and/or the website in their native language.

Other notable members of the team are Dr Giuseppe Remuzzi, Past-President, International Society of Nephrology, Kidney Fund, Bergamo, Italy; Dr Guillermo García-García, President, International Federation of Kidney Foundations, Guadalajara, Mexico; Dr Takashi Yokoo, Chief Professor and Medical Director, Jikei University School of Medicine, Tokyo, Japan; Dr Ho Chung Ping, Medical Director, Integrated Dialysis Facilities (HK) Ltd., Hong Kong, China; Dr Edison Souza, Professor, Nephrology University of Rio de Janeiro, Brazil; Dr Abdou Niang, Secretary-General, Senegalese Society of Nephrology, Dakar, Sénégal; Dr Valeriy Shilo, Associate Professor of the Department of Nephrology, FPDO MSMSU, Russia; Dr Ashok Kirpalani and Dr Dilip Pahari, Ex-President, Indian Society of Nephrology, India; and Dr Sanjib Kumar Sharma, Nepal.

The book and website are currently available in 39 different languages (See table below.) The book is also made available for free on WhatsApp Messenger.

References

External links
 Official website of the Kidney Education Foundation
 Official website of the International Society of Nephrology

Public health organisations based in India
Kidney organizations
Health charities in India